Pseudatemelia is a genus of gelechioid moths.

Taxonomy
In the systematic layout used here, it is placed in the subfamily Amphisbatinae of the concealer moth family (Oecophoridae). Delimitation of Amphisbatinae versus the closely related Depressariinae and Oecophorinae is a major problem of Gelechioidea taxonomy and systematics, and some authors separate the former two as full-blown families (Amphisbatidae and Depressariidae), and/or include the Amphisbatinae in Depressariinae (or Depressariidae), or merge them in the Oecophorinae outright.

Recent research has shown that this genus is one of those close to Lypusa, the type of the supposed Tineoidea family Lypusidae. The genus Pseudatemelia has to be dissolved and all the species previously assigned to it has to be transferred to the genus Agnoea, Lypusidae family, Gelechioidea superfamily.

Distribution
These moths are present in most of Europe, in the eastern Palearctic realm, in the Near East, and in North Africa.

Species
Two subgenera are recognized. Species of Pseudatemelia include:
 Subgenus Pseudatemelia (Pseudatemelia) Rebel, 1910
 Pseudatemelia aeneella Rebel, 1910
 Pseudatemelia amparoella Vives, 1986
 Pseudatemelia chalcocrates
 Pseudatemelia colurnella (Mann, 1867)
 Pseudatemelia detrimentella (Staudinger, 1859)
 Pseudatemelia filiella (Staudinger, 1859)
 Pseudatemelia flavifrontella  (Denis & Schiffermüller, 1775) 
 Pseudatemelia fuscifrontella (Constant, 1885)
 Pseudatemelia latipennella (Jäckh, 1959)
 Pseudatemelia lavandulae (Mann, 1855)
 Pseudatemelia pallidella Jäckh, 1972
 Pseudatemelia subgilvida (Walsingham, 1901)
 Pseudatemelia subochreella
 Pseudatemelia synchrozella (Jäckh, 1959)
 Pseudatemelia xanthosoma (Rebel, 1900)
 Subgenus Pseudatemelia (Tubuliferola) Strand, 1917
 Pseudatemelia elsae Svensson, 1982
 Pseudatemelia josephinae
 Pseudatemelia langohri E.Palm, 1990

References

Amphisbatinae